Nyingzhong Township, or Ningzhong Township is a township of Damxung County, Tibet Autonomous Region, China located  southwest of the county seat and  north-northwest of Lhasa. Road access to both the aforementioned places is provided by China National Highway 109. , it has 4 villages under its administration.

See also
List of towns and villages in Tibet

References

Populated places in Tibet
Township-level divisions of Tibet
Damxung County